The bioecological model of development is a theoretical model of gene–environment interactions in human development. This model, first proposed by Urie Bronfenbrenner and Stephen J. Ceci, in 1994, is an extension of Bronfenbrenner's original theoretical model of human development, called ecological systems theory. Bronfenbrenner developed the bioecological model after recognizing that the individual was overlooked in other theories of human development, which were largely focused on the context of development (e.g., the environment).

The bioecological model of human development can be applied to both children and maturing adults, and is thus a lifespan approach to development. The framework emphasizes the importance of understanding bidirectional influences between individuals’ development and their surrounding environmental contexts. In the bioecological model, in contrast to his earlier models, Bronfenbrenner also includes time (known as the chronosystem in his model) as an important component in the way that people and environments change. The bioecological model proposed a new method of conducting research which was heavily influential in developmental psychology and is still considered relevant today.

The original model 
"Ecological systems theory" was the initial name of Bronfenbrenner's model. Bronfenbrenner saw the necessity to comprehend how people evolve within their settings through the use of this framework. Bronfenbrenner identified five ecological systems in order to conceptualize environmental contexts:

1 The innermost layer of Bronfenbrenner's model is called the microsystem. The interpersonal relationships and direct interactions with the nearby surroundings make up this context, which is the closest to an individual. The microsystem includes, for illustration, a child's home and school

2Mesosystem: The interactions between numerous components of the microsystem are included in the mesosystem. Because these two direct impacts (components of the microsystem) may interact, the interaction between a child's home and school can be regarded as a part of the mesosystem.

3Exosystem: The exosystem includes components of the microsystem's structural elements but does not directly influence people. For instance, a child may be impacted by family financial issues, parental job loss, and other situations, but they do not directly effect the child

.Bronfenbrenner proposed that people constantly engage with these chronosystems. He added that both people and their environments have ongoing effects on one another. However, Bronfenbrenner saw a need to further improve this model after realizing there wasn't enough emphasis on how each person plays a part in their own development.

Evolution of Bronfenbrenner's theory 
Bronfenbrenner informally discussed new ideas concerning Ecological Systems Theory throughout the late 1970s and early 1980s during lectures and presentations to the psychological community. As he examined his original theory, he began to identify the role of other key factors in development. In 1986, Bronfenbrenner published his new theory and named it Bioecological Systems Theory.

One of Bronfenbrenner's main influences was Lev Vygotsky, a Russian teacher and psychologist. Vygotsky created the social learning theory of development in the 1920s and 1930s to understand how people learn in social contexts and how social environments influence the learning process (1962). Vygotsky recognized that learning always occurs and cannot be separated from a social context and that this process is integral to a child's development.

Kurt Lewin, a German forerunner of ecological systems models and the founder of modern social psychology, pioneered the use of theory and experimentation to test hypotheses. He focused on the life space, which he defined as a person's psychological activities that occur within a kind of psychological field. The life space that contains all the events in the past, present, and future that shape and affect an individual. This focus on individuality led him to diagram the life space, containing arrows leading to and from possible life goals, both positive and negative. In sum, Lewin's ecological systems model emphasized situational and proximal causes. Additionally, Lewin's theory demonstrates that behavior is a function of the current person by their environment, which are all affected by past experience.

Bronfenbrenner was also influenced by his colleague, Stephen J. Ceci, with whom he co-authored the article “Nature-nurture reconceptualized in developmental perspective: A bioecological theory” in 1994. Ceci is a developmental psychologist who redefined modern developmental psychology's approach to intellectual development. He focused on predicting a pattern of associations among ecological, genetic, and cognitive variables as a function of proximal processes. Together, Bronfenbrenner and Ceci published the beginnings of the bioecological model and made it an accessible framework to use in understanding developmental processes.

History 
The history of bioecological systems theory is divided into two periods. The first period resulted in the publication of Bronfenbrenner's theory of ecological systems theory, titled The Ecology of Human Development, in 1979. Bronfenbrenner described the second period as a time of criticism and evaluation of his original work.

The development of ecological systems theory arose because Bronfenbrenner noted a lack of focus on the role of context in terms of development. He argued the environment in which children operate is important because development may be shaped by their interactions with the specific environment. He urged his colleagues to study development in terms of ecological contexts, that is the normal environments of children (schools, homes, daycares). Researchers heeded his advice and a great deal of research flourished in the early 1980s that focused on context.

However, where prior research was ignoring context, Bronfenbrenner felt current research focused too much on context and ignored development. In his justification for a new theory, Bronfenbrenner wrote he was not pleased with the direction of research in the mid 1980s and that he felt there were other realms of development that were overlooked.

In comparison to the original theory, bioecological systems theory adds more emphasis to the person in the context of development. Additionally, Bronfenbrenner chose to leave out key features of the ecological systems theory (e.g., ecological validity and ecological experiments) during his development of bioecological systems theory.  As a whole, Bronfenbrenner's new theory continued to go through a series of transformations as he continuously analyzed different factors in human development. Critical components of bioecological systems theory did not emerge all at once. Instead, his ideas evolved and adapted to the research and ideas of the times.  For example, the role of proximal processes, which is now recognized as a key feature of bioecological systems theory, did not emerge until the 1990s. This theory went through a series of transformations and elaborations until 2005 when Bronfenbrenner died.

Process–Person–Context–Time 
Bronfenbrenner further developed the model by adding the chronosystem, which refers to how the person and environments change over time. He also placed a greater emphasis on processes and the role of the biological person. The Process–Person–Context–Time Model (PPCT) has since become the bedrock of the bioecological model. PPCT includes four concepts. The interactions between the concepts form the basis for the theory.

 1. Process – Bronfenbrenner viewed proximal processes as the primary mechanism for development, featuring them in two central propositions of the bioecological model.

Proposition 1: [H]uman development takes place through processes of progressively more complex reciprocal interaction between an active, evolving biopsychological human organism and the persons, objects, and symbols in its immediate external environment. To be effective, the interaction must occur on a fairly regular basis over extended periods of time. Such enduring forms of interaction in the immediate environment are referred to as proximal processes.

Proximal processes are the development processes of systematic interaction between person and environment. Bronfenbrenner identifies group and solitary activities such as playing with other children or reading as mechanisms through which children come to understand their world and formulate ideas about their place within it. However, processes function differently depending on the person and the context.

Proposition 2: The form, power, content, and direction of the proximal processes effecting development vary systematically as a joint function of the characteristics of the developing person; of the environment—both immediate and more remote—in which the processes are taking place; the nature of the developmental outcomes under consideration; and the social continuities and changes occurring over time through the life course and the historical period during which the person has lived.

 2. Person – Bronfenbrenner acknowledged the role that personal characteristics of individuals play in social interactions. He identified three personal characteristics that can significantly influence proximal processes across the lifespan. Demand characteristics such as age, gender or physical appearance set processes in motion, acting as “personal stimulus” characteristics. Resource characteristics are not as immediately recognizable and include mental and emotional resources such as past experiences, intelligence, and skills as well as material resources such as access to housing, education, and responsive caregivers. Force characteristics are related to variations in motivation, persistence and temperament. Bronfenbrenner notes that even when children have equivalent access to resources, their developmental courses may differ as a function of characteristics such as drive to succeed and persistence in the face of hardship. In doing this, Bronfenbrenner provides a rationale for how environments (i.e., the systems mentioned above under “The Original Model: Ecological Systems Theory”) influence personal characteristics, yet also suggests personal characteristics can change environments.

 3. Context  – Context involves five interconnected systems, which are based on Bronfenbrenner’s original model, ecological systems theory. The microsystem describes environments such as home or school in which children spend significant time interacting. Mesosystems are interrelations between microsystems. The exosystem describes events that have important indirect influence on development (e.g., a parent consistently working late). The macrosystem is a feature of any group (culture, subculture) that share values and belief systems. The chronosystem describes historical circumstances that affect contexts at all other levels.

 4. Time – Time has a prominent place in this developmental model. It is constituted at three levels: micro, meso, and macro. Micro-time refers to what is happening during specific episodes of proximal processes. Meso-time refers to the extent to which the processes occur in the person’s environment, such as over the course of days, weeks or years. Macro-time (or the chronosystem) focuses on the shifting expectancies in wider culture. This functions both within and across generations and affects proximal processes across the lifespan.
 	
Thus, the bioecological model highlights the importance of understanding a person's development within environmental systems. It further explains that both the person and the environment affect one another bidirectionally. Although even Bronfenbrenner himself critiqued the falsifiability of the model, the bioecological model has real world applications for developmental research, practice, and policies (as demonstrated below).

Research implications 
In addition to adding to the theoretical understanding of human development, the bioecological model lends itself to changes in the conceptualization of the research endeavor. In some of his earliest comments on the state of developmental research, Bronfenbrenner lamented that developmental research concerned itself with studying “strange behavior of children in strange situations for the briefest possible period of time”. He proposed, rather, that developmental science should take as its goal a study of children in context in order to best determine which processes are naturally “developmentally generative” (promote development) and which are naturally “developmentally disruptive” (prevent development).

Bronfenbrenner set up a contrast to the traditional “confirmatory” approach to hypothesis testing (in which research is done to “confirm” that a hypothesis is correct or incorrect) when specifying the types of research needed to support the bioecological model of development.  In Bronfenbrenner's view, the dynamic nature of the model calls for “primarily generative” research designs that explore interactions between proximal processes (see Proposition 1) and the developing person, environment, time, and developmental outcome (Proposition 2).  Bronfenbrenner called this type of research the “discovery mode” of developmental science.

To best capture such dynamic processes, developmental research designs would ideally be longitudinal (over time), rather than cross-sectional (a single point in time), and conducted in children's natural environments, rather than a laboratory. Such designs would thus occur in schools, homes, day-care centers, and other environments in which proximal processes are most likely to occur. The bioecological model also proposes that the most scientifically rich studies would include more than one distinct but theoretically related proximal process in the same design. Indeed, studies that claim to be based upon bioecological theory should include elements of process, person, context, and time, and should include explicit explanation and acknowledgement if one of the elements is lacking. Based on the interactions of proposed elements of the PPCT model, appropriate statistical analyses of PPCT data would likely include explorations of mediation and moderation effects, as well as multilevel modeling of data to account for the nesting of different components of the model. Moreover, research that includes both genetic and environmental components would capture even more of the bioecological model's elements.

Ecological techno-subsystem 

The ecological systems theory emerged before the advent of Internet revolution and the developmental influence of then available technology (e.g., television) was conceptually situated in the child's microsystem. Johnson and Puplampu, for instance, proposed in 2008 the ecological techno-subsystem, a dimension of the microsystem. This microsystem comprises both child interaction with living (e.g., peers, parents, teachers) and non-living (e.g., hardware, gadgets) elements of communication, information, and recreation technologies in immediate or direct environments. Johnson published a validation study in 2010.

See also 
 Ecological systems theory
 Diathesis-stress model

References

Genetics
Developmental psychology
Systems psychology